Mitrella dartevelli is a species of sea snail in the family Columbellidae, the dove snails.

Description
The shell grows to a length of 9.5 mm

Distribution
This species is distributed in the Atlantic Ocean along Gabon.

References

 Knudsen J. (1956) Marine prosobranchs of tropical West Africa (Stenoglossa). Atlantide Report 4:7–110, 4 pls.

Endemic fauna of Gabon
dartevelli
Gastropods described in 1956